Lamar is a city in and the county seat of Barton County, Missouri, United States. As of the 2020 census, the city population was 4,266. It is known as the birthplace of Harry S. Truman, the 33rd president of the United States.

The city government is consolidated with City Township. The city of Lamar is surrounded by, but is not part of, Lamar Township.

Geography
Lamar is located in central Barton County adjacent to a bend in the North Fork Spring River and lies on US Route 160 just east of US Route 71.

Climate

History
Lamar was laid out in 1856. It was named for Mirabeau B. Lamar, second president of the Republic of Texas. The city suffered multiple attacks by rebels during the Civil War.

On May 28, 1919, 28-year-old Jay Lynch was lynched in Lamar. It was considered to be a sundown town prior to the Civil Rights era.

Demographics

2010 census
At the 2010 census there were 4,532 people, 1,866 households, and 1,202 families living in the city. The racial makeup of the city was 94.5% White, 0.7% African American, 0.6% Native American, 0.3% Asian, 0.7% from other races, and 3.2% from two or more races. Hispanic or Latino of any race were 1.9%.

Of the 1,866 households 32.5% had children under the age of 18 living with them, 45.9% were married couples living together, 13.9% had a female householder with no husband present, 4.7% had a male householder with no wife present, and 35.6% were non-families. 31.2% of households were one person and 17.7% were one person aged 65 or older. The average household size was 2.38 and the average family size was 2.96.

The median age was 39.6 years. 25.8% of residents were under the age of 18; 8.2% were between the ages of 18 and 24; 22.3% were from 25 to 44; 24.2% were from 45 to 64; and 19.5% were 65 or older. The gender makeup of the city was 46.6% male and 53.4% female.

2000 census
At the 2000 census there were 4,425 people, 1,835 households, and 1,154 families living in the city. The population density was 1,154.5 people per square mile (446.1/km). There were 1,995 housing units at an average density of 520.5 per square mile (201.1/km).  The racial makeup of the city was 96.61% White, 0.18% African American, 0.61% Native American, 0.34% Asian, 0.14% Pacific Islander, 0.34% from other races, and 1.79% from two or more races. Hispanic or Latino of any race were 1.40%.

Of the 1,835 households 32.0% had children under the age of 18 living with them, 48.2% were married couples living together, 11.4% had a female householder with no husband present, and 37.1% were non-families. 33.3% of households were one person and 18.1% were one person aged 65 or older. The average household size was 2.35 and the average family size was 2.98.

The age distribution was 26.6% under the age of 18, 8.5% from 18 to 24, 24.9% from 25 to 44, 19.5% from 45 to 64, and 20.5% 65 or older. The median age was 37 years. For every 100 females, there were 87.2 males. For every 100 females age 18 and over, there were 80.8 males.

The median household income was $29,296 and the median family income  was $38,007. Males had a median income of $26,375 versus $20,688 for females. The per capita income for the city was $15,684. About 9.7% of families and 12.1% of the population were below the poverty line, including 11.0% of those under age 18 and 17.2% of those age 65 or over.

Transportation
Lamar Municipal Airport (LLU) serves the city and surrounding communities.

Education
Public education in Lamar is administered by Lamar R-I School District, which operates Lamar High School.

Lamar has a public library, a branch of the Barton County Library.

Notable people

 Blaine Durbin — Major League Baseball player with Chicago Cubs, Cincinnati Reds and Pittsburgh Pirates in early 20th century
 Wyatt Earp and family — famous frontier lawman
 Ed Emery — Missouri state senator and former state representative
 Joe Ihm — Missouri state representative
 Charles Henry Morgan — Missouri congressman as both a Democrat (1875–79, 1883–85) and a Republican (1909–11)
 Henry Carroll Timmonds — Missouri state representative and judge in late 19th century
 Harry S. Truman — 33rd president of the United States, in office 1945–1953; elected vice president in 1944; became president upon death of Franklin Delano Roosevelt in 1945

References

External links
 City of Lamar
 Historic maps of Lamar in the Sanborn Maps of Missouri Collection at the University of Missouri

Cities in Barton County, Missouri
County seats in Missouri
Populated places established in 1852
1852 establishments in Missouri
Cities in Missouri
Sundown towns in Missouri